Brian Stevens may refer to:

 Brian "Stack" Stevens (1941–2017), English rugby union player
 Brian Stevens (cricketer) (born 1942), former English cricketer
 Birth name of English professional wrestler Peter Thornley (born 1941)

See also
Brian Stephens (disambiguation)